Rosehip neurons are inhibitory GABAergic neurons present in the first layer (the molecular layer) of the human cerebral cortex. They make up about 10-15% of all inhibitory neurons in Layer 1. Neurons of this type (having "large ‘rosehip’-like axonal boutons and compact arborization") exist in humans, but have not been reported in rodents.

Rosehip neurons are named after the rose hip fruit due to the axon terminal's resemblance to their berries.

These rosehip cells show an immunohistochemical profile (GAD1+CCK+, CNR1–SST–CALB2–PVALB–) matching a single transcriptomically defined cell type whose specific molecular marker signature is not seen in mouse cortex. Rosehip cells in layer 1 make homotypic gap junctions, predominantly target apical dendritic shafts of layer 3 pyramidal neurons, and inhibit backpropagating pyramidal action potentials in microdomains of the dendritic tuft. These cells are therefore positioned for potent local control of distal dendritic computation in cortical pyramidal neurons.

Discovery 
An international group of scientists discovered Rosehip neurons and announced their discovery in August 2018. These authors contributed equally to this work: Eszter Boldog (University of Szeged, Szeged, Hungary), Trygve E. Bakken (Allen Institute for Brain Science, Seattle, WA, United States), and Rebecca D. Hodge (Allen Institute for Brain Science, Seattle, WA, United States). They identified this cell with the help of RNA sequencing.

See also
Endorestiform nucleus, a nucleus discovered in 2018 which is uniquely present in human.

References

GABA
Cerebral cortex
Neurons
Central nervous system neurons